The Confederation type was a large locomotive type with a 4-8-4 wheel arrangement used on Canadian railways.  Most were built by the Montreal Locomotive Works (MLW) in Montreal, Quebec, and the Canadian Locomotive Company (CLC) in Kingston, Ontario, for the Canadian National Railway (CNR).  The "Confederation" type was later given the more common designation "Northern" type.  They were the backbone of the CNR locomotive fleet from the 1930s to the 1950s.  Eight locomotives of this type have been preserved from the CNR and 2 CPR fleets.

CN 6400 used roller-bearing boxes on all running and tender axles, with bearings made by SKF of Sweden. CN ordered 155 U-2 classes from 1927-1944. CN also ordered 5 U-4a’s in 1936, and the GTW ordered 36 U-3 Classes from 1927 to 1943. The GTW ordered 5 U-4b’s in 1938. In total, 203 were built for CN and the GTW. All 203 locomotives remained in service until they were retired between 1953 and 1959. A few have survived into preservation, CN 6153, CN 6167, CN 6200, CN 6213, CN 6218 and CN 6400 and two from the GTW survived as well, GTW 6323 and GTW 6325.

List of subclasses

 U-2-a: Built 1927, numbered 6100-6119
 U-2-b: Built 1927, numbered 6120-6139
 U-2-c: Built 1929, numbered 6140-6159
 U-2-d: Built 1936, numbered 6160-6164
 U-2-e: Built 1940, numbered 6165-6179
 U-2-f: Built 1940, numbered 6180-6189
 U-2-g: Built 1943, numbered 6200-6234
 U-2-h: Built 1944, numbered 6235-6264
 U-3-a: Built 1927, numbered 6300-6311
 U-3-b: Built 1943-1944, numbered 6312-6336
 U-4-a: Built 1936, numbered: 6400-6404
 U-4-b: Built 1938, numbered: 6405-6410

CP built its own K1a 4-8-4's in 1928 at their own Angus Shops. They were numbered 3100-3101, the only two built. Both remained in service until both retired in 1955 and both are preserved.

Preservation

 CN 6153: On display at the Canadian Railway Museum.
 CN 6167: On display at downtown Guelph.
 CN 6200: On display at the Canada Science and Technology Museum in Ottawa.
 CN 6213: On display at downtown Toronto at the Toronto Railway Heritage Centre.
 CN 6218: On display at Fort Erie Railroad Museum at Fort Erie, Ontario.
 CN 6400: On display at the Canada Science and Technology Museum in Ottawa.
 GTW 6323: On display at the Illinois Railway Museum in Union, Illinois.
 GTW 6325: Owned by the Age of Steam Roundhouse in Sugarcreek, Ohio.
 CP 3100: On display at the Canada Science and Technology Museum in Ottawa.
 CP 3101: On display at EVRAZ (formerly IPSCO Steel) Regina, Saskatchewan.

In fiction
The character Vinnie (voiced by John Schwab) from the popular series Thomas and Friends is based on a Canadian National U-4-a, using the number of a GTW U-4-b.

Gallery

References

External links
 CN "Confederations" at Steam Locomotive.com - retrieved 11 May 2008
 CP "Confederations" at Steam Locomotive.com - retrieved 11 May 2008
 CN 6153 at Steam Locomotive.info - retrieved 11 May 2008
 CN 6167 at GHRA.ca - retrieved 25 May 2008
 CN 6200 at Railpictures.net - retrieved 19 May 2008
 CN 6218 at the Fort Erie Railroad Museum - retrieved 19 May 2008
 CN 6400 (and others) photo gallery - retrieved 12 May 2008
 CP 3100 at Railroadforums.com - retrieved 19 May 2008
 CP 3101 at Railarchive.net - retrieved 19 May 2008

Steam locomotives of Canada
Steam locomotive types
Preserved steam locomotives of Canada
4-8-4 locomotives
Canadian National Railway
Canadian National Railway locomotives
Passenger locomotives